Vanderlan Barbosa da Silva (born 7 September 2002), simply known as Vanderlan, is a Brazilian footballer who currently plays as a left back for Palmeiras.

Club career
Born in Brumado, Bahia, Vanderlan joined Palmeiras' youth setup in 2017. In January 2021, he signed his first professional contract with the club, until 2024.

Vanderlan made his first team – and Série A – debut on 26 January 2021, coming on as a second-half substitute for Lucas Lima in a 1–1 home draw against Vasco da Gama.

Career statistics

Honours
Palmeiras
Copa Libertadores: 2020, 2021
Recopa Sudamericana: 2022
Campeonato Paulista: 2022
Campeonato Brasileiro Série A: 2022
Supercopa do Brasil: 2023

References

External links
Palmeiras profile 

2002 births
Living people
Sportspeople from Bahia
Brazilian footballers
Association football defenders
Campeonato Brasileiro Série A players
Sociedade Esportiva Palmeiras players